Erik-Jan de Boer (born March 1967) is a freelance visual effects supervisor. Since 1989 he has worked on many commercials and Hollywood productions. For the 85th Academy Awards he won the Academy Award for Best Visual Effects for his work on Life of Pi.

He is currently in production on Landscape with Invisible Hand a movie by director Cory Finley.

References

External links
 

1967 births
Living people
Dutch animated film directors
Best Visual Effects Academy Award winners
Best Visual Effects BAFTA Award winners
Dutch animators
Dutch expatriates in the United States
Special effects people
Utrecht School of the Arts alumni
Visual effects artists
Visual effects supervisors
Mass media people from Amsterdam